Sartaguda is a town and municipality located in the province and autonomous community of Navarre, northern Spain. (Sartagueta in euskera)

References

External links
 SARTAGUDA in the Bernardo Estornés Lasa - Auñamendi Encyclopedia (Euskomedia Fundazioa) 

Municipalities in Navarre